Sreerama Chandra Mynampati (born 19 January 1991) is an Indian playback singer and actor. He debuted his playback career in the Telugu film industry. Sreerama won the fifth season of music reality show Indian Idol . In 2013, he made his Telugu cinema acting debut with the film Jagadguru Adi Shankara. He has also played the lead in Prema Geema Jantha Nai. He acted with Salman Khan for an advertisement of Suzuki.

Personal life 
Sreerama Chandra was born in Addanki, a town in the Prakasam district of Andhra Pradesh, into a Telugu speaking Brahmin family. His father is a High Court advocate while his mother is a housewife. In spite of a non-musical background, Sreerama Chandra had a passion towards singing and started singing in his school days from N.Ch.Parthasarathy and during college days.

He did his schooling at St. Andrews School, Bowenpally, Secunderabad and graduated (BTech) from the Royal Institute of Technology and Science (RITS). He learnt music at Sri Bhakta Ramadasu Govt. College Of Music And Dance, Secunderabad from Bhaskara Haripriya (One of the Hyderabad Sisters – The Singing Divine Duo).

Career 
Sreerama Chandra started singing during his school days, but started playback singing at the age of 17. He has completed his fifth year of his Certificate course in Carnatic vocal at Sri Bhakta Ramadasa Music College, Marredpally, Secunderabad. After participating in ETV's Sye, a singing reality show, Telugu film music director Mickey J Meyer spotted Sreeram's talent and had him sing "Chirugalithone Adiga" for a movie called Notebook.

He worked on an advertising campaign with Suzuki that featured Salman Khan. He released his debut Hindi album Rehnuma in 2010 and said it is a tribute to his loved ones. He has started recording his new music album called Crazy Love.

In 2021, Chandra entered the reality TV show Bigg Boss Telugu season 5 as a contestant.
He has a huge following from family audience. He was the 1st finalist and 2nd runner-up of the show.

Competitions 
 Finalist and 1st Runner-up of Jo Jeeta Wohi Super Star 2 in 2012
 Title Winner of Indian IdolSeason 5 by Sony Entertainment Television. in 2010 (19 March to 15 August 2010).
 Title Winner of Okkare conducted by ETV in 2008 (June–December).
 Reached Top 18 of Amul STAR Voice of India conducted in the year 2007 March.
 Finalist in Sye Singer's Challenge conducted in 2006–07, by ETV.
 Qualified for Delhi Finals Sangam Kala Group(Delhi), conducted in November 2006, by Hero Honda.
 Winner of radio competition Voice of Andhra, Was conducted in the year 2005–06 by FM radio.
 Runner-up in Relax songs competition conducted by Ramana Gogula in 2005.
 Winner of Ananda Ragam Contest conducted by the team from Anand in 2004.
 Runner of The Remix season-1 by Amazon prime India in 2018.
2nd Runner-up of Bigg Boss Telugu 5 in 2021.

Achievements and performances 
 He started performing shows at the age of 8 and has done many stage shows including classical and filmi music.
 He performed shows with singers, Mano, Malathi, Sunitha. He has done shows with Limca.
 He has performed along with Koti, M. M. Keeravani, Madhavpeddi Suresh, Vandemataram Srinivas, Ghantadi Krishna and many more music directors.
 He sang three songs in Sabari Gireesha Saranam an audio CD composed by Mantha Srinivas.
 His first performance was in Hyderabad was on 25 September 2010.
 He performed at the 2010 Commonwealth Games New Delhi closing ceremony along with singers like Shankar Mahadevan, Shreya Ghoshal, Sunidhi Chauhan etc.

Awards 
 Sreerama won the Lata Mangeshkar Award from Andhra Pradesh Government.
 He was awarded the P. B. Sreenivas Award on 19 October by singer P. B. Sreenivas at Ravindra Bharathi, Hyderabad, A.P.
 Sreerama received the Ghantasala Award on 4 December.
 He won the Indian Idol 5 contest on 15 August 2010
 In the non-film music category of GIMA 2011 Indian Idol 5 winner Sreerama won best music debut for Rehnuma

Discography

Filmography

Television

References

External links 

 

Indian male playback singers
Telugu playback singers
1988 births
Living people
Indian Idol participants
Indian Idol winners
Idols (TV series) winners
Singers from Andhra Pradesh
People from Prakasam district
People from Secunderabad
Bigg Boss (Telugu TV series) contestants
Telugu Indian Idol